Gasterostena is a genus of moths in the family Sesiidae.

Species
Gasterostena funebris  Kallies & Arita, 2006
Gasterostena ikedai  Arita & Gorbunov, 2003
Gasterostena rubricincta  Kallies & Arita, 2006
Gasterostena vietnamica  Arita & Gorbunov, 2003

References

Sesiidae